Sarah Hanffou (born 8 October 1986, in Roubaix, France) is a Cameroonian table tennis player. She competed at the 2012 Summer Olympics in the women's singles.  She beat Tvin Moumjoghlian in the preliminary round, before losing 4 - 1 to Xian Yi Fang in the first round proper.

In November 2015, Hanffou received the Athletes in Excellence Award from The Foundation for Global Sports Development, in recognition of her community service efforts and work with youth. Since 2018, she also counts among the ITTF Foundation ambassadors to help raise awareness of social issues, and use her talent and status to bring about positive social changes.

She qualified to represent Cameroon at the 2020 Summer Olympics.

References

Cameroonian table tennis players
Table tennis players at the 2012 Summer Olympics
Olympic table tennis players of Cameroon
1986 births
Living people
Sportspeople from Roubaix
Table tennis players at the 2020 Summer Olympics
20th-century Cameroonian women
21st-century Cameroonian women